Ibuprofen/famotidine, sold under the brand name Duexis, is a fixed-dose combination medication used for the treatment of rheumatoid arthritis and osteoarthritis. It contains ibuprofen, a nonsteroidal anti-inflammatory drug (NSAID) and famotidine, a histamine H2-receptor antagonist.

Ibuprofen/famotidine is available as a generic medication.

References

Further reading

External links 
 

Analgesics
Combination drugs
H2 receptor antagonists
Nonsteroidal anti-inflammatory drugs